Benito Minicucci (born April 27, 1966) is an American business executive. He is the president and chief executive officer of Alaska Air Group, the parent company of Alaska Airlines and Horizon Air.

Early life and education 
Minicucci was born in Montreal, Quebec. His parents immigrated to Montreal from Italy in the 1950s. Minicucci received his bachelor's and master's degrees in mechanical engineering from the Royal Military College of Canada. In 2012, he completed the advanced management program at Harvard Business School.

Career 
Following graduation from college, Minicucci served 14 years in the Canadian Armed Forces.  After, he joined Air Canada where he worked in a variety of roles in technical operations and later as vice president of heavy maintenance.

Minicucci joined Alaska Airlines in 2004, where he first served as staff vice president of maintenance. He went on to hold roles as executive vice president of Alaska’s operations in Seattle and chief operating officer.  In 2016, he became president of Alaska Airlines where he led the company’s expansion into California and served as CEO of Virgin America during Alaska’s acquisition of the airline. AFAR (magazine) named Minicucci one of their Global Visionaries in 2019.

On March 31, 2021, Minicucci was elected president and chief executive officer of Alaska Air Group, succeeding Brad Tilden.

Philanthropy and civic engagement 
Minicucci serves on board of directors for Airlines for America, UNCF Seattle, World Trade Center Seattle, Challenge Seattle, Washington Roundtable, and the University of Washington Foster School of Business Center for Leadership and Strategic Thinking Advisory Board.

Personal life 
Minicucci became a U.S. citizen in 2012. He lives in Issaquah, Washington.

References 

1967 births
Living people
Alaska Air Group people
Businesspeople from Montreal
Canadian emigrants to the United States
Harvard Business School alumni
Royal Military College of Canada alumni
Air Canada people
People from Issaquah, Washington
Canadian people of Italian descent
American people of Italian descent